This is a list of Virginia Cavaliers football players in the NFL Draft.

Key

Selections

References

Virginia

Virginia Cavaliers NFL Draft